SM1 can refer to:

 SM-1, a nuclear reactor
 SM1, a postcode district within the SM postcode area, in Sutton, Greater London
 Signalman First Class, a former rating in the U.S. Navy
 A surface-to-air missile, RIM-66 Standard (SM-1MR) or RIM-67 Standard (SM-1ER)
 VR Class Sm1, a type of train operated by the VR Group
 Spider-Man, the first film in the Spider-Man film series
 Scary Movie, the first film in the Scary Movie series
 Superman, the first Superman film
 SM1, Secondary Math 1